Neuronal acetylcholine receptor subunit alpha-5, also known as nAChRα5, is a protein that in humans is encoded by the CHRNA5 gene. The protein encoded by this gene is a subunit of certain nicotinic acetylcholine receptors (nAchR).

Function 

Nicotinic acetylcholine receptors (nAChRs), such as CHRNA5, are members of a superfamily of ligand-gated ion channels that mediate fast signal transmission at synapses. The nAChRs are thought to be (hetero)pentamers composed of homologous subunits.  CHRNA5 is a candidate gene for predisposition to nicotine dependence and to lung cancer risk.  Polymorphisms in the CHRNA5 promoter are functionally associated with CHRNA5 transcript levels in lung tissue.

Interactive pathway map

See also
 Nicotinic acetylcholine receptor

References

Further reading

External links 
 
 

Ion channels
Nicotinic acetylcholine receptors